Nicola Maria Rossi, also known as Nicolò Maria (Naples, 1690 – Naples, 23 April 1758) was an Italian painter of the late-Baroque.

Biography
At the age of 15 years, he had begun studying a classic education, but after a fireworks injury damaged on eye, he became a pupil of Francesco Solimena in 1706. Nicola later likely tutored Corrado Giaquinto while in that studio.

Rossi painted an altarpiece of the Immaculate Conception with Saints and Bishops for the church of the Cappuccinelle sopra Ponte Corbo. Rossi was called to Vienna, to paint a Hall for the Marquis of Refrano, a counselor for the Holy Roman Emperor Charles VI. He depicted Heroic virtue crowned by Glory, Fame, and other Virtues. In Vienna, he also painted portraits of the chancellor, the Count of Zinzendorff, and others in the court. Her returned to Naples, where he worked for the Viceroy Aloys Thomas Raimund Graf Harrach. He painted allegoric and mythologic panels, as well as large canvases depicting the viceroys functions in various public ceremonies, to be sent to his palace (Palais Harrach) in Vienna. Many of these works are now housed in the Schloss Harrach in Rohrau, Austria. One of the panels depicted the Viceroy visiting on September 8 the church of Santa Maria di Piedigrotta, Naples. He also painted two large canvases, placed lateral to the main altar depicting The Discovery of the True Cross by Saint Helena and Emperor Heraclius Paying Penitent Homage to the True Cross for the church of Santa Croce di Lucca. Rossi also painted some of the rooms of the Queen in the Royal Palace of Naples with frescoes of Minerva and Aurora. He painted for the church of San Lorenzo, two canvases: one of the Virgin with Angels and the instruments of Passion and  the other Two Saints of the Order of Servites.

References

18th-century Italian painters
Italian male painters
Italian Baroque painters
1690 births
1758 deaths
Painters from Naples
18th-century Italian male artists